Gahnia graminifolia is a tussock-forming perennial in the family Cyperaceae, that is native to parts of Tasmania.

References

graminifolia
Plants described in 1894
Flora of Tasmania